L’Union Sportive Avranches Mont Saint Michel is a French football club based in Avranches, in the department of Manche, and founded in 1897. Since 2014 it plays in the Championnat National, the third tier of French football.

The club has been chaired by Gilbert Guérin since 1990.

History

Football arrived in Avranches in the mid-19th century, due to an influx of British immigrants who brought their customs and lifestyle to the area. In 1895, Paul Lebedel and Auguste Desclos, with approval from Henri Goujon, formed the Association Sportive du Collège d'Avranches. The club had several sections of sport, which included gymnastics, fencing and shooting, but the club specialized in football. The ASCA recruited most of their players from students who attended the university and players who lived nearby. The club endured difficulties following a match against Stade Rennais Université, now Stade Rennais F.C., after the external players arrived home too late following the match. This caused a significant outrage from their parents and guardians and, eventually, the ASCA were forced to abandon signing players from outside the university. Due to this, a man named Alexandre Legrand concluded that the people outside the university should form their own club. After discussions, the club was formed in April 1897 as L’Union Sportive Avranches'''. Due to his input, Legrand was inserted as the club's treasurer. The club competed mainly against local colleges in Avranches and played their first official match against AS du Collège de Vire''.

Chairmen

Current state
The club's performance during the 20th century was mostly muted with the club often hovering in between the 7th, 6th, 5th, and 4th divisions until reaching the Championnat National during its inaugural season in 1993–94. The competition, at the time, involved two geographical areas and was mostly the top amateur clubs. The club won its first match, a 2–0 victory over AS Cherbourg, and went undefeated in their first nine matches. However, the club soon hit a slide and ended up finishing 9th. They remained in National for another three years before suffering relegation to the CFA, where they lasted only one year falling down to CFA 2 in 1998–99. After 10 years in CFA 2, the club finally returned to the CFA after their 2nd-place finish.

Team kit
The club's kit are manufactured by the English sporting goods company Umbro.

Notable coaches

Players

Current squad

Reserve squad

References

 
Association football clubs established in 1897
1897 establishments in France
Sport in Manche
Football clubs in France
Football clubs in Normandy